4 Non Blondes were an American alternative rock band from San Francisco, active from 1989 to 1994. Their only album, Bigger, Better, Faster, More!, spent 59 weeks on the Billboard 200 and sold 1.5 million copies between 1992 and 1994. They hit the charts in 1993 with the release of the album's second single, "What's Up?".

Originally, the band was all-female, with vocalist Linda Perry, bassist Christa Hillhouse, guitarist Shaunna Hall, and drummer Wanda Day. However, along with Day being replaced by Dawn Richardson, Hall was replaced by Roger Rocha before the release of the album.

Perry left the band in 1994, and the remaining members disbanded shortly after.

Career
Bassist Christa Hillhouse and guitarist Shaunna Hall had been roommates and met drummer Wanda Day when they joined a band she was playing in. When the three left that band, they started playing as a trio, but after seeing Perry sing at a solo performance, Hillhouse and Hall asked her to join as vocalist.  

According to Perry, she and Hall were at Nightbreak, a San Francisco club, and when it was mentioned the trio was looking for a vocalist, Perry announced she was a singer, to which Hall replied, "I know". Their first rehearsal was supposed to be at 6:10 pm on October 17, 1989, but shortly after 5:00 pm the Loma Prieta earthquake hit the San Francisco area.

The unusual name of the band came from an experience the group had in the Bay Area with a blonde family. According to Christa Hillhouse, "Right next to us, there's a trash receptacle with a piece of pizza on top and the kid wanted to pick it up. The mom said, 'No, it's probably dirty, what with the pigeons and people.' And she stared right at us. We were Non Blondes."

The experience and the name became a symbol that they didn't fit the California stereotype.

They got their start in the San Francisco bar scene, especially lesbian bars, gaining a significant lesbian following. In July 1991, the band was signed to Interscope following a performance at the Gavin Convention, where they opened for Primus on Valentine's Day of the same year. As they began pre-production for their debut album, Day was fired and replaced by Dawn Richardson. In 1992, while recording Bigger, Better, Faster, More! the album's producer, David Tickle, felt that Hall's guitar playing was "not happening" so she was let go from the band as well. 

Guitarist Louis Metoyer finished the record. The album and its song "What's Up?" was released as the album's second single in 1993. It was successful in the United States and in several European countries, peaking at number one in Austria, Belgium, Bulgaria, Germany, Iceland, Ireland, the Netherlands, Norway, Poland, Sweden, and Switzerland.

Roger Rocha joined after completion of the album and stayed with the band until 1994. 

Openly lesbian lead singer Perry often performed with a prominent "dyke" sticker affixed to her guitar, including at the Billboard Music Awards in 1993 and on Late Night with David Letterman. 

4 Non Blondes contributed the song "Mary's House" to the film Wayne's World 2 in 1993. They also covered Van Halen's "I'm the One" on the soundtrack for Airheads. They contributed "Bless the Beasts and Children" to a 1994 The Carpenters tribute album If I Were a Carpenter, and "Misty Mountain Hop" to the 1995 Encomium tribute album to Led Zeppelin.

The group disbanded in late 1994 during the recording of their second album. Perry has said that she had been unhappy with Bigger, Better, Faster, More! She has also explained that her sexuality had a part to play in her tensions with the group. Perry was an out lesbian, but band members Hillhouse and Richardson were less comfortable being as open about their sexuality in the early 1990s.   

Perry went solo in 1995. She has released solo work, and produced and written songs on albums by Christina Aguilera, Alicia Keys, Pink, Gwen Stefani, Courtney Love and Kelly Osbourne. 

Hall has recorded, produced, composed for and performed with various artists, including vocalist Storm Large (1999–2001), guitarist Eric McFadden (1995–2001) and funk pioneer George Clinton & Parliament Funkadelic and released "Electrofunkadelica: e3+FUNKnth = music for the body, mind & soul", a self-produced project in 2006 on Make Music, Not War! Records.

After leaving the Non Blondes in 1991, Day continued drumming with Malibu Barbi, and then Bad Dog Play Dead. In late 1992, an accident crushed her legs and broke her back, which made drumming very painful. She moved out of San Francisco in 1995, spent some time in Arizona and eventually went back to Salt Lake City. Day died on July 10, 1997, and is buried in Tropic, Utah.

Hillhouse maintains the official website for 4 Non Blondes.

Perry and Hillhouse reunited in 1999 in support of Perry's solo tour. 

On May 11, 2014, the group reunited to perform a concert at a fundraiser entitled "An Evening For Women: Celebrating Arts, Music and Equality" which was held at the Beverly Hilton in Los Angeles. Perry produces the annual event for the L.A. Gay & Lesbian Center to raise money for the center. According to Perry, "the majority of the money goes to the youth center program, which is basically kids that get thrown out on the street by their own parents for being gay." The six songs on the track list were "Train", "Spaceman", "The Ladder", "Mighty Lady", "Superfly" and "What's Up?," and the fundraiser was organized by the Los Angeles LGBT Center.

Members
 Wanda Day – drums (1989–1991; died 1997)
 Shaunna Hall – lead guitar (1989–1992)
 Christa Hillhouse – bass, backing vocals (1989–1994, 2014)
 Linda Perry – lead vocals, rhythm guitar (1989–1994, 2014)
 Dawn Richardson – drums (1991–1994, 2014)
 Roger Rocha – lead guitar, backing vocals (1992–1994, 2014)
 Louis Metoyer – lead guitar (1992)

Timeline

Discography

Studio album

Live album  
Hello Mr. President (Live in Italy 1993) (1994)

Singles

Videos

 1992 – "Dear Mr. President"
 1993 – "What's Up?"
 1993 – "Spaceman"
 1994 – "Superfly"
 1995 – "Misty Mountain Hop"
 1996 – "4 Non Blondes vs BBC"

Awards and nominations

See also
 List of bands from the San Francisco Bay Area

References

External links
 
 
 A Story of 4 Non Blondes by Christa Hillhouse
 4 Non Blonde Page on Founding Guitarist Shaunna Hall's Official Website

1989 establishments in California
1996 disestablishments in California
All-female bands
Atlantic Records artists
Alternative rock groups from California
Hard rock musical groups from California
Interscope Records artists
Musical groups established in 1989
Musical groups disestablished in 1996
Musical quartets